"My Moon My Man" is the first single off Canadian singer-songwriter Feist's album The Reminder (2007). The song was co-written by Feist and songwriter Chilly Gonzalez. 

"My Moon My Man" was used in a Verizon Wireless commercial and featured in the Season 4 Grey's Anatomy episode "Let The Truth Sting." A Boys Noize remix of the song was featured as a bonus track on his debut album Oi Oi Oi.

Music video 
The video for "My Moon My Man" takes place in an airport at night. Feist steps onto a moving walkway, puts down her suitcase, and begins to dance as other travelers pass in and out of the frame. At times, the travelers dance as well. As the song progresses, the normal airport lighting changes to dramatic blue tinted lighting. When the song ends, the other travelers disappear, the lights come back on, and Feist picks up her suitcase and leaves the moving walkway. 

The music video was shot in Toronto Pearson International Airport in the middle of the night. Due to the lighting, the beginning of the video had to be re-shot in the upstairs of a bar near the airport.

Charts

Certifications

References

2007 singles
Feist (singer) songs
Songs written by Chilly Gonzales
Cherrytree Records singles
2007 songs
Songs written by Feist (singer)